Jana caesarea is a moth of the  family Eupterotidae. It can be found in  Tanzania.

The body of the male of this species has a length of 51mm, the length of its forewings is 73 mm and its wingspan 134mm..
the forewings are grey-brown, they have two parallel transversal lines near the base. The hindwings are clear-grey, with two black-brown traversal lines. The underside of both wings is uniform brownish-ochreous yellow with two brownish transversal lines in the middle.

References

Moths described in 1909
Janinae